The Zamora River (Spanish: Río Zamora) is a tributary of the Santiago River located in the south-east of Ecuador. Historically, it was known to the Spanish as Yaya Mayu ("Father River"), from the river's name among a group of Shuar encountered nearby.

The sources of the Zamora River are in the Podocarpus National Park, specifically at the Nudo de Cajanuma. The river then descends towards the city of Loja. It crosses the provinces of Loja, Zamora-Chinchipe (wherein lies the city of Zamora) and Morona-Santiago, where it empties into the Santiago.

Tributaries
The Zamora is the dominant river in southeastern Ecuador, and has many tributaries, perhaps the source of its native name . 

The most significant tributaries by province include:

Loja Province
 Malacatos River
 Jipiro River
 Zamora Huayco River
Zamora-Chinchipe Province
 Tambo Blanco River
 San Francisco River
 Sabanilla River
 Bombuscaro River
 Jamboé River
 Nambija River
 Yacuambi River
 Chicaña River
 Nangaritza River
 Pachicutza River
 Chuchumbletza River
Morona-Santiago Province
 Bomboiza River
 Bobonaza River

See also
 

Rivers of Ecuador
Geography of Loja Province
Geography of Morona-Santiago Province
Geography of Zamora-Chinchipe Province